Vallon-Pont-d'Arc is a commune in the Ardèche department, Auvergne-Rhône-Alpes region, Southern France.

Vallon-Pont-d'Arc is a capital of prehistoric and cultural tourism. This small village, peaceful in wintertime, sees its population expand ten-fold in summer. Its tourist importance largely comes from the fact that it is the departure point for the river descent of the Gorges de l'Ardèche (from Pont d'Arc to Saint-Martin-d'Ardeche).

Geography
Vallon-Pont-d'Arc is situated at the threshold of one of the most beautiful tourist sites of France: "les gorges de l'Ardèche" (the Ardèche canyon). The famous Pont d'Arc, a natural arch of more than 30 metres height, carved out by the Ardèche and classified as a Great Site of France, gave it its name.

 southeast of the village, the River Ibie flows into the Ardèche, which forms all of the commune's southwestern border.

Climate

Vallon-Pont-d'Arc has a humid subtropical climate (Cfa) according to the Köppen climate classification.

History
 1801: Saint-Martin-d'Arc renamed to Chames
 1825: Chames renamed to Vallon
 1948: Vallon becomes Vallon-Pont-d'Arc (25 September

Administration

Population

Sights

 The Pont d'Arc
 The Chauvet Cave is not open to the public. An exposition site, copied from the cave, is open to the public so they can discover the oldest paleolithic paintings - 32.000 B.C. - and the lifestyle of the Cro-Magnon man.
 The museum of the Chauvet Cave
 The town hall (a castle constructed in 1639 under Louis XIII) houses seven tapestries from Aubusson, showing the crusades, exhibited in the Hall of Honour
 The Gorges de l'Ardèche
 The Gorges de l'Archèche National Park
 Android tourism guide
 Domaine de Segries (the PGL camp base for the Ardeche

Events
The village is very lively, especially in summer, with in its centre numerous shops and a market on Thursday and on Tuesday evening, which is known for its large success.
Every summer, many events are organized: the lavender feast and the olive feast, prehistoric days with expositions, ateliers, conferences and presentations lasting for over a week after August 15.

Personalities
 Deceased in 1971 the painter René Aberlenc

See also

 Communes of the Ardèche department

References

Communes of Ardèche
Ardèche communes articles needing translation from French Wikipedia